Victoria was a former territorial electoral district that was mandated to return a single member to the North-West Legislative Assembly from 1894 until Alberta became a province in 1905.

Geography
The electoral district was named for Fort Victoria on the North Saskatchewan River. It covered the section of the District of Alberta north and east of Edmonton, including the village of Fort Saskatchewan.

Members of the Legislative Assembly (MLAs) 

Victoria elected Frank Fraser Tims as its representative in the 1894 election, who was then defeated by Jack Shera in 1898. Both were independents, as there were no political parties in these elections, and the territory was governed by consensus. When the Dominion parties were introduced in 1902, Shera remained an independent and was elected to a second term.

He sought re-election in the modified Victoria district after Alberta was created in 1905 as a Conservative, but was soundly defeated.

Election results

|}

|}

|}

References

External links 
Website of the Legislative Assembly of Northwest Territories

Former electoral districts of Northwest Territories